The 12th ACTRA Awards were presented on April 16, 1983. The ceremony was hosted by Don Harron.

Prime Minister Pierre Trudeau presented the top award for Best Television Program, and jokingly added Question Period as a fourth nominee in the category.

Television

Radio

Journalism and special awards

References

ACTRA
ACTRA
ACTRA Awards